Catherine Slessor  is an architecture writer, critic and former editor of The Architectural Review, and a contributor to Dezeen and Architects' Journal. She received an MBE in 2016 for her services to architectural journalism and in 2021 was elected president of The Twentieth Century Society.

Biography 
Slessor was born in Aberdeen, Scotland. She studied architecture at the University of Edinburgh, and holds an MA in Architectural History from the Bartlett School of Architecture, University College London. Slessor started her writing career as a technical editor at Architects' Journal in 1987. She moved to The Architectural Review in 1992, and was its editor for five years from 2009-2015. She was the magazine's first female editor. Her books have been translated into several languages, including Spanish, German, Dutch and Chinese.

Selected publications
See-through houses  inspirational homes and features in glass (2001, Ryland Peters and Small)
 Eco-tech: sustainable architecture and high technology (1997 (2nd ed. 2001),)
Contemporary doorways: architectural entrances, transitions and thresholds (1992,)
Contemporary staircases (1990,)

References 

Year of birth missing (living people)
Living people
Alumni of The Bartlett
Members of the Order of the British Empire
20th-century Scottish architects
21st-century Scottish architects
20th-century Scottish writers
21st-century Scottish writers
British women architects
Scottish magazine editors
Women magazine editors
Architects from Aberdeen
Scottish architecture writers
Architecture critics
English architecture writers
20th-century Scottish women writers
21st-century Scottish women writers
Alumni of the University of Edinburgh
Alumni of University College London